Melanthius is the third largest impact crater on Tethys, one of Saturn's moons. Melanthius is noted for its prominent cluster of central peaks, which were formed in the original impact. The crater is centered at 58.5°S, 192.61°W.

Melanthius crater is named after the character Melanthius, son of Dolius, who was Odysseus' disloyal goatherd in Homer's Odyssey.

References

External links
 Cassini images of Melanthius Crater

Impact craters on Saturn's moons
Surface features of Tethys (moon)